Adwen or Adwenna was a 5th-century Christian virgin and saint. She is recorded as a daughter of Brychan, king of Brycheiniog in south Wales, in the Cornish Life of Saint Nectan and in Robert Hunt's collection of Cornish legends. These sources associate her with the establishment of the parish of Advent in Cornwall.

The saint's feast day is unknown. In Cornwall Adwen was traditionally the patron saint of sweethearts.

See also
 Saint Dwynwen, the related Welsh saint
 St Adwen's Church, Advent

References

Medieval Cornish saints
Medieval Welsh saints
Children of Brychan
5th-century Christian saints
5th-century Welsh people
5th-century Welsh women
Female saints of medieval Wales